"Either Way" is a song by English rock band the Twang, released on 28 May 2007 as the second single from the band's debut album Love It When I Feel Like This. By downloads alone, "Either Way" initially entered at  33 on the UK Singles Chart and moved up to a peak position of No. 8 the following week due to sales of the physical release. It stayed on the chart for a total of seven weeks.

A remix of the song by the Streets was released, featuring rapper Professor Green. ShortList included the remix in their list of "The 10 best Mike Skinner remixes, B-sides, and rarities", saying: "Skinner and Professor Green featured on a remix of their (actually quite good (or at least not-that-bad)) track ‘Either Way’ and turned it into an absolute belter."

Track listing
UK CD single 
 "Either Way" – 4:06
 "Lost My Smile" – 3:23

UK 7-inch single 1 
A. "Either Way" – 4:06
B. "Wake Up" – 3:26

UK 7-inch single 2 
 "Either Way" – 4:06
 "Your Beats" – 3:47

Charts

References

2007 songs
2007 singles
The Twang songs
B-Unique Records singles